Yair "Jonah" Lotan (born July 3, 1973) is an Israeli actor best known for appearing in  Hostages, Foyle's War and 24.

Early life and education
Lotan was born Yair Zlotogorsky in Jerusalem, Israel, on July 3, 1973, and grew up in Jerusalem and the U.S. state of New York. His family returned to live in Jerusalem when he was twelve years-old and he attended Hebrew University Secondary School. His father is a psychologist and his mother is a physician.  He served for three years in the Israeli Defense Forces during the 1990s. In his early 20s he embarked on a modelling career and appeared as a host of children's shows on Channel 1. He graduated with a degree in cinema from Tel Aviv University. Lotan then moved to London to pursue a master's degree at the London Academy of Music and Dramatic Art.

Career
Lotan starred as Joe Farnetti in Foyle's War, a British drama set around real-life war stories in which characters must wage personal war amid the chaos of an actual war. He stated that his character in Foyle's War reminded him of a friend in the military who had an ability to see humor in any given situation. He voiced the lead role in the 2001 video game Operation Flashpoint: Cold War Crisis, as David Armstrong, a U.S. Army soldier serving in the Cold War. He appeared in the 2001 film Swimming Pool as Chris, played Kenny in the 2004 television series NY-LON, and acted next to Keira Knightley as an intern in 2005 film, The Jacket. Lotan also had a role in the fifth season of 24, as Spenser Wolff, and appeared in four episodes of CSI: NY as Marty Pino, a doctor/serial-killer. Lotan played Jesse in the 2006 film, One Night with the King, and was in the 2006 television film, The Beyond, centering on NASA scientists at a jet propulsion laboratory during a global crisis. Lotan was also in the 2008 HBO historical war drama Generation Kill, as Robert Timothy Bryan, a U.S. Navy corpsman. He was also cast for the lead role in David Milch's HBO pilot Last of the Ninth.

In September 2017, Yair Jonah Lotan appeared as Joel Singer in Oslo (play)  by J. T. Rogers  at Royal National Theatre's Lyttelton Stage. The production was scheduled to transfer to the West End Harold Pinter Theatre  in October 2017.

Personal life
Lotan was previously engaged to the British actress, Kelly Reilly.

Filmography

References

External links

1973 births
Israeli emigrants to the United States
Israeli male film actors
Israeli male television actors
Israeli male models
Jewish male models
Living people
Alumni of the London Academy of Music and Dramatic Art
Tel Aviv University alumni